The following is a list of lords and later on margraves of Bergen op Zoom. Bergen op Zoom became separated from the lordship of Breda in 1287 under the nominal overlordship of the duchy of Brabant. In 1559 the lordship was elevated to the rank of margraviate. The title was only a nominal one until 1795 when it was abolished.

Lords of Bergen op Zoom

House Wezemaal

Gerard                   1287-1309  
Arnold                   1309-1313
Mathilde                 1313-1340

House Voorne

Johanna                  1340-1349

House Boutershem

Hendrik I                1351-1371
Hendrik II               1371-1419
Hendrik III                   1419

House of Glyme

Margraves of Bergen op Zoom (1559)

House of Glymes

John IV of Glymes                   1541-1567

House Merode
   
Maria Margaretha         1577-1588

House of Witthem

Maria Mencia             1588-1613

House van den Bergh
Maria Elizabeth I        1614-1633
Maria Elizabeth II       1635-1671

House von Hohenzollern

Henriëtte Franzisca      1672-1698

House of La Tour d'Auvergne

Francois Egon de La Tour d'Auvergne           1698-1708
Maria Henriette de La Tour d'Auvergne          1708-1728

House von Sulzbach

Karl Philip Theodor      1729-1795 

 
 
Bergen op Zoom
People from Bergen op Zoom